Tosa Bay is a bay north of the line connecting Cape Muroto and Cape Ashizuri in Kochi Prefecture, Japan. Tosa Bay is better fishing grounds in Japan, which is strongly affected by the Kuroshio Current.

References 

Bays of Japan
Landforms of Kōchi Prefecture